Moonaree Station is a pastoral lease that operates as a sheep station in South Australia.

The property is adjacent to Lake Gairdner in the Gawler Range.

The station was established prior to 1885. At this time the property was owned by Messrs Davies and Co.

The area around Moonaree and Kumberta Downs was subjected to a prolonged heat wave in 1894 with a temperature of  recorded in the sun at Moonaree at the hottest part of the day with temperatures of  recorded two hours after sunset.

Acquired by the Hawker brothers, the property was struck by drought in 1902 and plagued by feral dogs. The Hawkers sold off Moonaree, Carriewerloo, Paralana and Kolenda Station.

The land occupying the extent of the Moonaree pastoral lease was gazetted by the Government of South Australia as a locality in April 2013 under the name Moonaree.

See also
List of ranches and stations

References

Pastoral leases in South Australia
Stations (Australian agriculture)
Far North (South Australia)